The 1970 European Aquatics Championships were held in Barcelona, Spain from 5 to 13 September 1970. Titles were contested in swimming, diving and water polo (men). The swimming program was significantly expanded. Both men and women competed in the 200 m freestyle, 100 m breaststroke and 200 individual medley for the first time. Furthermore, in the men's swimming program the 100 m butterfly was introduced and the 100 m backstroke was re-introduced after having been absent for the last two championships. In the women's swimming program, the 800 m freestyle, 200 m backstroke and 200 m butterfly were introduced.

Medal table

Medal summary

Diving
Men's events

Women's events

Swimming

Men's events

Women's events

Water polo

See also
List of European Championships records in swimming

References

External links
LEN  European Aquatics Championships at SVT's open archive (including 1970 event) 

LEN European Aquatics Championships
European 1970
European Championships
European Aquatics Championships
European Aquatics
September 1970 sports events in Europe
1970s in Barcelona
1970 in Catalonia